Mary Rosamond Haas (January 23, 1910 – May 17, 1996) was an American linguist who specialized in North American Indian languages, Thai, and historical linguistics. She served as president of the Linguistic Society of America. She was elected a fellow of the American Academy of Arts and Sciences and a member of the National Academy of Sciences.

Early life and education

Haas was born in Richmond, Indiana. She attended high school and Earlham College in Richmond.

She completed her PhD in linguistics at Yale University in 1935 at the age of 25, with a dissertation titled A Grammar of the Tunica Language.  In the 1930s, Haas worked with the last native speaker of Tunica, Sesostrie Youchigant, producing extensive texts and vocabularies.

Career and research

Early work in linguistics
Haas undertook graduate work on comparative philology at the University of Chicago. She studied under Edward Sapir, whom she would follow to Yale. She began a long career in linguistic fieldwork, studying various languages during the summer months.

Over the ten-year period from 1931 to 1941, Haas studied the Wakashan language Nitinat (Ditidaht), as well as a number of languages that were mainly originally spoken in the American southeast: Tunica, Natchez, Creek, Koasati, Choctaw, Alabama, Cherokee and Hichiti. Her first published paper, A Visit to the Other World, a Nitinat Text, written in collaboration with Morris Swadesh, was published in 1933.

Shortly after, Haas conducted fieldwork with Watt Sam and Nancy Raven, the last two native speakers of the Natchez language in Oklahoma. Her extensive unpublished field notes have constituted the most reliable source of information on the now dead language. She conducted extensive fieldwork on the Creek language, and was the first modern linguist to collect extensive texts in the language. Her Creek texts were published after her death in a volumed edited and translated by Jack B. Martin, Margaret McKane Mauldin, and Juanita McGirt.

Career at the University of California-Berkeley
During World War II, the United States government viewed the study and teaching of Southeast Asian languages as important to the war effort, and under the auspices of the Army Specialized Training Program at the University of California at Berkeley, Haas developed a program to teach the Thai language. Her authoritative Thai-English Students' Dictionary, published in 1964, is still in use.

In 1948, she was appointed assistant professor of Thai and Linguistics at the University of California, Berkeley Department of Oriental Languages, an appointment she attributed to Peter A. Boodberg, whom she described as "ahead of his time in the way he treated women scholars—a scholar was a scholar in his book".  She became one of the founding members of the UC-Berkeley Department of Linguistics when it was established in 1953. She was a long-term chair of the department, and she was Director of the Survey of California Indian Languages at Berkeley from 1953 to 1977. She retired from Berkeley in 1977, and in 1984 she was elected a Berkeley Fellow.

Mary Haas died at her home in Berkeley, California, on May 17, 1996, at the age of 86.

Role in teaching
Haas was noted for her dedication to teaching linguistics, and to the role of the linguist in language instruction. Her student Karl V. Teeter pointed out in his obituary of Haas that she trained more Americanist linguists than her former instructors Edward Sapir and Franz Boas combined: she supervised fieldwork in Americanist linguistics by more than 100 doctoral students. As a founder and director of the Survey of California Indian Languages,  she advised nearly fifty dissertations, including those of many linguists who would go on to be influential in the field, including William Bright (Karok), William Shipley (Maidu), Robert Oswalt (Kashaya), Karl Teeter (Wiyot), Catherine Callahan (Penutian),  Margaret Langdon (Diegueño), Sally McLendon (Eastern Pomo), Victor Golla (Hupa), Marc Okrand (Mutsun), Kenneth Whistler (Proto-Wintun), Douglas Parks (Pawnee and Arikara), William Jacobsen (Washo), and others.

Personal life 
She married Morris Swadesh, a fellow linguist, in 1931. They divorced in 1937.

Awards and honors
In 1963, Haas served as president of the Linguistic Society of America. She was awarded a Guggenheim Fellowship in 1964. She was elected a fellow of the American Academy of Arts and Sciences in 1974, and she was elected to the National Academy of Sciences in 1978. She received honorary doctorates from Northwestern University in 1975, the University of Chicago in 1976, Earlham College, 1980, and the Ohio State University in 1980.

Notable students
Haas trained many notable linguists, including the following:
 James Matisoff
 Margaret Landon
 Terrence Kaufman
 Anthony C. Woodbury
 William O. Bright
 William A. Foley
 John W. Du Bois
 Wick R. Miller
 William F. Shipley
 Karl V. Teeter
 William C. Sturtevant
 Marc Okrand

Selected publications
 The Thai system of writing, 1943. American Council of Learned Societies.
 Spoken Thai, 1945 [co-authored with Heng R. Subhanka]. Linguistic Society of America.
 Thai reader, 1945, Berkeley.
 Tunica texts, 1950. University of California publications in linguistics, 6.1. Berkeley: University of California Press. 173pp.
 Thai vocabulary, 1955. American Council of Learned Societies. 
 The prehistory of languages, 1960. Mouton. [Reprint 2018] 
 Thai-English student's dictionary, 1964. Stanford University Press. 
 Language, culture, and history : essays, 1978. Stanford University Press. 
 Creek (Muskogee) texts, 2015. [co-authored with James H. Hill]. University of California Press.

References

External links
 Mary Haas Papers at the American Philosophical Society
 Electronic version of Haas and Subhanka's Spoken Thai
 Obituary at Sealang Library
 Concise Encyclopædia Britannica entry
 Interview recorded on September 30, 1984 (University of Florida Digital Collections)

1910 births
1996 deaths
People from Richmond, Indiana
Linguists from the United States
Women linguists
Historical linguists
University of California, Berkeley faculty
Yale University alumni
University of Chicago alumni
Earlham College alumni
Fellows of the American Academy of Arts and Sciences
Members of the United States National Academy of Sciences
Women lexicographers
20th-century American women scientists
20th-century American women writers
20th-century American non-fiction writers
20th-century American scientists
Linguists of Algic languages
Linguists of Siouan languages
Linguists of Muskogean languages
Paleolinguists
Linguists of Thai
Linguists of Wakashan languages
Linguistic Society of America presidents
American women non-fiction writers
20th-century linguists
20th-century lexicographers